This article contains a list of wasps of Great Britain. The following species are of the order Hymenoptera and suborder Apocrita that is neither a bee nor ant.

Family Dryinidae

Family Embolemidae 
 Embolemus ruddii

Family Bethylidae

Family Chrysididae (cuckoo wasps)

Chrysis ignita
Chrysis ruddii
Chrysis viridula

Family Tiphiidae

Family Mutillidae

Family Scoliidae

Family Pompilidae (spider wasps)

Sub-family Ceropalinae

Genus Ceropales
Ceropales maculata

Sub-family Pepsinae

Genus Auplopus
Auplopus carbonarius

Genus Cryptocheilus
Cryptocheilus notatus

Genus Dipogon
Dipogon bifasciatus
Dipogon subintermedius
Dipogon variegatus

Genus Priocnemis
Priocnemis perturbator

Sub-family Pompilinae

Genus Anoplius
Anoplius nigerrimus

Genus Aporus
Aporus unicolor

Genus Episyron
Episyron gallicum
Episyron rufipes

Genus Evagetes
Evagetes crassicornis

Genus Homonotus
Homonotus sanguinolentus

Genus Pompilus
Pompilus cinereus- Leaden spider wasp

Family Vespidae

Subfamily Eumeninae (potter and mason wasps)

Genus Eumenes 
 Eumenes coarctatus

Genus Pterochilus 
 Pterochilus phaleratus

Genus Euodynerus 
 Euodynerus quadrifasciatus

Genus Pseudepipona 
 Pseudepipona herrichii – Purbeck Mason-wasp

Genus Odynerus

Subgenus Odynerus
 Odynerus melanocephalus
 Odynerus spinipes

Subgenus Spinicoxa
 Odynerus reniformis
 Odynerus simillimus

Genus Gymnomerus 
 Gymnomerus laevipes

Genus Microdynerus 
 Microdynerus exilis

Genus Ancistrocerus 
 Ancistrocerus antilope
 Ancistrocerus gazella
 Ancistrocerus nigricornis
 Ancistrocerus parietinus
 Ancistrocerus parietum
 Ancistrocerus quadratus
 Ancistrocerus scoticus
 Ancistrocerus trifasciatus

Genus Symmorphus 
 Symmorphus bifasciatus
 Symmorphus connexus
 Symmorphus crassicornis
 Symmorphus gracilis

Subfamily Vespinae (social wasps)

Genus Polistes 
 Polistes dominula

Genus Vespa (hornets) 
 Vespa crabro – European hornet

Genus Dolichovespula

Subgenus Dolichovespula 
 Dolichovespula media – median wasp

Subgenus Pseudovespula 
 Dolichovespula norwegica – Norwegian wasp
 Dolichovespula saxonica – Saxon wasp
 Dolichovespula sylvestris – Tree wasp

Genus Vespula (typical social wasps)

Subgenus Vespula 
Vespula austriaca
Vespula rufa – red wasp

Subgenus Paravespula 
Vespula germanica – German wasp
Vespula vulgaris – common wasp

Family Sphecidae

Family Crabronidae 
 Cerceris rybyensis – ornate tailed digger wasp
 Philanthus triangulum – European beewolf

References

 Else, George "Section 10 – Check List of British Hymenoptera Aculeata" in Archer, Michael (2005) Bees, Wasps and Ants Recording Society Members' Handbook  (pp. 113 – 131)

L
Wasps
Wasps, Britain
Wasps
L